Bridge of Dun is a privately owned station in Angus. The adjacent platforms and line are independently operated as a preserved railway by the Caledonian Railway (Brechin) Ltd.

History
The station was originally opened by the Aberdeen Railway, on what became the northern stage of the Caledonian Railway Route to the North from London to Aberdeen.

References

Notes

Sources 
 
 
 
 Caledonian Railway (Brechin) Ltd

External links

Annotated video of Bridge of Dun railway station in June 2015

Heritage railway stations in Angus, Scotland
Former Caledonian Railway stations
Railway stations in Great Britain opened in 1848
Railway stations in Great Britain closed in 1967
Railway stations in Great Britain opened in 1993
Beeching closures in Scotland